Duilio Brignetti (17 August 1926 – 7 February 1993) was an Italian modern pentathlete. He competed at the 1948 and 1952 Summer Olympics.

References

1926 births
1993 deaths
Italian male modern pentathletes
Olympic modern pentathletes of Italy
Modern pentathletes at the 1948 Summer Olympics
Modern pentathletes at the 1952 Summer Olympics
Sportspeople from Livorno
20th-century Italian people